Sadio Doumbia and Fabien Reboul were the defending champions but chose not to defend their title.

Hunter Reese and Jan Zieliński won the title after defeating Robert Galloway and Hans Hach Verdugo 6–4, 6–2 in the final.

Seeds

Draw

References

External links
 Main draw

Sibiu Open - Doubles
2020 Doubles